Tregear is a suburb of Sydney, in the state of New South Wales, Australia.

Tregear has privately owned housing, Department of Housing homes and a small shopping centre. Which is popular.

There were slightly more women than men, more than 10% were Indigenous and almost 30% were born overseas. The land area amounts to 163 hectares.

History
Tregear was the name of a homestead built in the area which at one stage was owned by John King-Lethbridge, son of Robert Copland Lethbridge and Mary King. It was named after the Lethbridge family's estate in Cornwall, England. The land was held by Lethbridge family until 1942 when it was taken over by the RAAF and then sold in 1951.

Commercial area
Tregear has a small shopping centre which consists of an IGA supermarket, chemist, post office, newsagent, butcher, take-away shop and a doctor. There is a small car park out the front of the shopping complex, with a public pay phone as well. It is a 10-minute drive from Westfield Mount Druitt Shopping Centre. There are only two sets of traffic lights in Tregear. There are 3 GP offices in Tregear.

Schools
Tregear has a local public primary school and a preschool which also is a church.

Recreation
Tregear Reserve covers a vast span of the suburb and allows off-leash dog-walking.

References

Suburbs of Sydney
City of Blacktown